30 Days of Night is a three-issue horror comic book miniseries written by Steve Niles, illustrated by Ben Templesmith, and published by American company IDW Publishing in 2002. All three parties co-own the property.

The series takes place in Barrow, Alaska, so far north that during the winter, the sun does not rise for 30 days. In the series, vampires, being vulnerable to sunlight, take advantage of the prolonged darkness to openly kill the townspeople and feed at will.

Initially an unsuccessful film pitch, the series became a breakout success story for Steve Niles, whose previous works had received relatively little attention. It was also the first full-length work by co-creator Ben Templesmith. The series has been followed by numerous sequel series, and in 2007, was adapted into a film of the same name.

Plot summary
Vampires flock to Barrow, Alaska, where the sun sets for about 30 days, allowing them to feed without the burden of sleep to avoid lethal sunlight. When the vampire elder Vicente learns of this plan, he travels to Barrow to end the feeding, to preserve the secrecy of vampires. Because of the cold, the vampires' senses are weakened and a few of the town's residents are able to hide. One such resident is Sheriff Eben Olemaun, who saves the town by injecting vampire blood into his veins. He uses his enhanced strength to fight Vicente, saving the lives of the few remaining townspeople, including his wife Stella. Suffering the same weakness as all vampires, Eben allows himself to die and turns to ash when the sun rises.

Characters

Humans
 Eben Olemaun
 Stella Olemaun
 Jason Clifton
 Agent Andy Gray
 Jose Alex Diaz
 Chris Johnson

Vampires
The Nosferatu were once ruled by a "Council of Elders" led by Vicente. When the council decided to make themselves known to the human race, humanity rebelled and persecuted most of their race. After a millennium, only a handful survived, led by Vicente.

In the series, vampirism is portrayed as a virus, one that can be spread through scratches, bites, and contact with vampire blood. The disease turns humans who contract it undead and gives them a mouthful of shark-like fangs and black eyes, as well as superhuman strength and speed, an aversion to sunlight, and superhumanly acute senses of sight, smell, and hearing. However, these senses can be weakened by extreme cold. Also, some vampires possess additional powers, such as teleportation, telepathy, and the ability to disguise oneself. Vampires in the series differ in many ways from their mythological counterparts: impaling them with a wooden stake will not, on its own, kill them; neither will exposing them to garlic or even fire. They are extremely resilient, capable of withstanding grenades going off on their bodies, or surviving after losing half of their faces to explosions. The only way to kill them is to behead them, or expose them to the vitamins generated in direct sunlight, which sets them on fire, and burns them to ash rapidly. Also, large amounts of ultraviolet light burns them and probably can kill them, but they can never stay dead for long; if blood hits their ashes, they will regenerate.

 Vicente
 Marlow
 Lilith
 Agent Norris
 Santana
 Dane
 Billy
 Zurial
 Thomas Ramandt
 Eben Olemaun
 Stella Olemaun

Collected editions

30 Days of Night was originally published as several miniseries of 22-page comic books from IDW Publishing. These single issues are now collected in several trade paperbacks, as well as hardcover collections.

 30 Days of Night (paperback, collects 30 Days of Night #1-3, June 2004). The first printing featured the autographs of Steve Niles and Ben Templesmith.
 30 Days of Night (hardcover, collects 30 Days of Night #1-3, December 2004)
 The Complete 30 Days of Night (hardcover, collects 30 Days of Night #1-3, January 2004)
 Dark Days (paperback, collects Dark Days #1-6, April 2004)
 The Complete Dark Days (hardcover, collects Dark Days #1-6, December 2004)
 30 Days of Night: Return to Barrow (paperback, collects Return to Barrow #1-6, October 2004)
 30 Days of Night: Return to Barrow (hardcover, collects Return to Barrow #1-6, October 2004)
 30 Days of Night: Bloodsucker Tales (paperback, collects Bloodsucker Tales #1-8, September 2005)
 30 Days of Night: Bloodsucker Tales (hardcover, collects Bloodsucker Tales #1-8, August 2005)
 30 Days of Night: Three Tales (paperback, collects 30 Days of Night Annual #2, 30 Days of Night: Dead Space #1-3, 30 Days of Night: Picking up the Pieces, July 2006)
 30 Days of Night Annual #2: "The Journal of John Ikos" - Written by Steve Niles, art by Nat Jones.
 30 Days of Night: Dead Space - Written by Steve Niles and Dan Wickline, art by Milx.

 30 Days of Night: Spreading the Disease (paperback, collects Spreading the Disease #1-5, July 2007). Written by Dan Wickline, art by Alex Sanchez.
 30 Days of Night: Eben and Stella (paperback, collects Eben and Stella #1-4, November 2007). Written by Steve Niles and Kelly Sue DeConnick, art by Justin Randall.
 30 Days of Night: Red Snow (paperback, collects Red Snow #1-3, January 2008). Written and illustrated by Ben Templesmith.
 30 Days of Night: Beyond Barrow (paperback, collects Beyond Barrow #1-3, March 2008). Written by Steve Niles.
 30 Days of Night: 30 Days 'Til Death (paperback, collects 30 Days 'Til Death #1-4, June 2009). Written and illustrated by David Lapham.

Awards
30 Days of Night: Return to Barrow garnered Steve Niles and Ben Templesmith's first Eisner Award nominations in 2005. These included:
 Nomination, Best Limited Series
 Nomination, Best Writer (Steve Niles)
 Nomination, Best Painter/Multimedia Artist (Ben Templesmith)

Adaptations

Audio
Audible produced a full-cast audio dramatization released in 2017.

Films

A film adaptation of the original 30 Days of Night miniseries was produced by Columbia Pictures and Ghost House Pictures. The screenplay went through several versions and writers, among them Steve Niles and Stuart Beattie. The film was directed by David Slade and stars Hollywood actors Josh Hartnett and Melissa George. It was released on October 19, 2007, and was filmed at Henderson Valley Studios in Auckland, New Zealand.

A sequel to the film was released in October 2010. 30 Days of Night: Dark Days was directed by Ben Ketai and stars Kiele Sanchez as Stella Oleson.

Novels
An ongoing series of 30 Days of Night novels is being published by IDW Publishing and Pocket Books. They include a novelization of the film.
 30 Days of Night (film novelization) by Tim Lebbon 
 30 Days of Night: Rumors of the Undead by Steve Niles and Jeff Mariotte 
 30 Days of Night: Immortal Remains by Steve Niles and Jeff Mariotte 
 30 Days of Night: Eternal Damnation by Steve Niles and Jeff Mariotte 
 30 Days of Night: Light of Day by Jeff Mariotte and Steve Niles 
 30 Days of Night: Fear of the Dark by Tim Lebbon

References

External links
 30 Days section on Steve Niles' site
 Steve Niles Interview for 30 Days of Night at UGO
 Epstein, Daniel Robert (2007). "Ben Templesmith Speaks!". UGO. Retrieved July 31, 2007.
 Weiland, Jonah (2003). "Niles Talks Horror Comics and Film". Comic Book Resources. Retrieved January 1, 2006.

 
2002 comics debuts
Comics by Steve Niles
Vampires in comics
American comics adapted into films
2002 comics endings
Utqiagvik, Alaska